Aristides (530–468 BCE) was an Athenian soldier and statesman who fought in the Battle of Marathon.

Aristides, also transliterated as Aristeides or Aristeidis, may refer also to:

People

Aristides of Thebes (4th century BCE), painter
 Aristeides (sculptor), (4th century BCE), sculptor
Aristides of Miletus (2nd century BCE), writer of salacious tales

Aelius Aristides (117–181), orator and rhetorician
Aristides of Athens (2nd century), Christian writer and saint
Aristides Quintilianus (3rd century), author of a musical treatise
Aristeidis Moraitinis (1806–1885), Greek politician
Arístides Villanueva, Argentine politician and merchant and governor of Mendoza Province (in office 1870–1873)
Arístides Maragliano, Puerto Rico jurist (in office 1898–1899)
Arístides Martínez (1847–1908), Chilean general
Aristides Brezina (1848–1909), Austrian mineralogist 
Aristeidis Stergiadis (1861–1949), Greek politician, High Commissioner of Smyrna in 1919–22
Arístides Chavier Arévalo (1867–1942), Puerto Rican pianist, composer, musicologist, and music author
Aristides Agramonte (1868–1931), American physician, pathologist and bacteriologist
Aristeidis Chasapidis (1875–1941), Greek general
Aristides de Sousa Mendes (1885–1954), Portuguese diplomat who issued visas to Jews seeking to flee the Nazis
Aristeidis Moraitinis (aviator) (1891–1918), Greek military aviator and World War I ace
Aristeidis Metallinos (1908–1987), Greek sculptor
Aristides Leão (1914–1993), Brazilian biologist
Aristides Fraga Lima (born 1923), Brazilian writer 
Aristides Pereira (19232011), first president of Cape Verde from 1975 to 1991
Arístides Bastidas (1924–1992), Venezuelan journalist, educator and scientist
Aristidis Moschos (1930–2001), Greek musician
Fred Aristidès (1931–2013), (known as Fred) French cartoonist
Aristides Demetrios (born 1931), American modernist sculptor
Aristides Royo (born 1940), President of Panama from 1978 to 1982
Aristides Baltas (born 1943), Greek physicist and politician
Aristides Sánchez (1943–1993), Nicaraguan Contra rebel
Aristides Gomes (born 1954), Prime Minister of Guinea-Bissau from 2005 to 2007
Arístides Mejía (born 1960), Honduran lawyer and Vice President Commissioner of Honduras
Arístides González (born 1961), Puerto Rican boxer
Arístides Victoria Yeb (born 1966), politician from the Dominican Republic
Arístides Rojas (born 1970), Paraguayan footballer
Aristides Masi (born 1977), Paraguayan footballer
Aristeidis Grigoriadis (born 1985), Greek swimmer
Aristeidis Lottas (born 1988), Greek footballer
Aristides Soiledis (born 1991), Greek football player 
Aristides Aquino (born 1994), Dominican baseball player
Joseph Epstein (writer) (born 1937), American editor and prolific essayist who used the pen name "Aristides"
Prince Aristidis-Stavros of Greece and Denmark (born 2008), grandson of deposed Greek king Constantine II

Horse racing
Aristides (horse) (1872-1893), American racehorse who won the first Kentucky Derby in 1875
Aristides Breeders' Cup Stakes, a horse race held every June in Kentucky

Other uses
2319 Aristides, a minor planet

See also
 Aristide (disambiguation), the French, Romanian, and Italian spelling